The 1913 European Rowing Championships were rowing championships held on the Ghent–Terneuzen Canal in the Belgian city of Ghent. The competition was for men only and they competed in five boat classes (M1x, M2x, M2+, M4+, M8+). These were the last European Rowing Championships before the annual regatta was interrupted by WWI; the next championships would be held in 1920 in Mâcon.

Background
It was the first time that the German rowing federation sent competitors to the European Rowing Championships and they were immediately successful, winning two out of the five boat classes (M1x and M8+). The single sculls competition descended into a farce, with the umpire twice calling for a restart. The Italian rower Giuseppe Sinigaglia and the Russian rower Anatol Peresselenzeff, who started for France, were then disqualified. In the eventual final Polydore Veirman capsized and the German rower Friedrich Graf was the only one to reach the finish line.

Medal summary

Footnotes

References

European Rowing Championships
European Rowing Championships
Rowing
Rowing
European Rowing Championships
Sport in Ghent